John Perez Aguon is a Guamanian former politician who served as Senator in the Guam Legislature for 6 terms. He is the member of Democratic Party of Guam.

Political career

Guam Legislature

Elections

Committee leadership
Chairman, Committee on Rules, 18th Guam Legislature.
Chairman, Committee on Tourism & Transportation, 20th, 21st, 22nd, and 23rd Guam Legislatures.
Vice Speaker, 23rd Guam Legislature

Gutierrez-Aguon Gubernatorial Ticket (1986)
In 1986, Senator Carl T.C. Gutierrez teamed up with Senator Aguon to run for the Democratic nomination for Governor and Lieutenant Governor of Guam. The Gutierrez-Aguon ticket lost to incumbent Governor Ricardo J. Bordallo and incumbent Lieutenant Governor Edward Diego Reyes in the primary election.

References

20th-century American politicians
Chamorro people
Guamanian Democrats
Living people
Members of the Legislature of Guam
Year of birth missing (living people)